Pachrukhi is a Community development block and a town in Siwan district, in Bihar state of India. It is one of the 13 blocks which comprise Siwan Subdivision. The headquarter of the block is at Pachrukhi town. 

The block is divided into many Gram Panchayats and villages.

Gram Panchayats
Gram panchayats of Panchrukhi block in Siwan Subdivision, Siwan district.

Bharatpura
Bhatwaliya
Bindusar bujurg
Gopal pur
Hardiya
Jasauli
Mahuari
Makhanupur
Pachrukhi
Papaur
Pipra
Sahlour
Sarauti
Shambhopur
Supauli
Surbala
Tarwara
Ukhai

See also
Administration in Bihar

References

Community development blocks in Siwan district